Trippi is a surname. Notable people with the surname include:

Charley Trippi (1921–2022), American football player
Joe Trippi (born 1956), American political strategist
Peter Trippi, American magazine editor, art critic, and biographer

See also
Tripi (disambiguation), includes people with surname Tripi
Trippy (disambiguation), includes people with surname Trippy
Tripp (surname)